Rod Baker (born March 18, 1952) is an American professional basketball coach who most recently served as a scout for the Philadelphia 76ers of the NBA.

College career
Baker played basketball at the College of the Holy Cross in Worcester, Massachusetts from 1970 to 1974. While playing, he earned a Bachelor of Arts Degree in English and was an Education Minor.

Head coaching record

References

External links
Profile at Eurobasket.com

1952 births
Living people
American Basketball Association (2000–present) coaches
American men's basketball coaches
Bakersfield Jam coaches
Brown Bears men's basketball coaches
Cincinnati Bearcats men's basketball coaches
College men's basketball head coaches in the United States
Columbia Lions men's basketball coaches
Continental Basketball Association coaches
Delaware 87ers coaches
Harlem Globetrotters coaches
Holy Cross Crusaders men's basketball players
Rutgers Scarlet Knights men's basketball coaches
Saint Joseph's Hawks men's basketball coaches
Seton Hall Pirates men's basketball coaches
Tufts Jumbos men's basketball coaches
UC Irvine Anteaters men's basketball coaches
American men's basketball players